Halobacteroides halobius is a species of bacteria, the type species of its genus. It is a moderately halophilic, anaerobic, long rod-shaped, motile, Gram-negative and non-sporulating bacterium.

References

Further reading
Whitman, William B., et al., eds. Bergey's manual® of systematic bacteriology. Vol. 3. Springer, 2012.
Oren, Aharon. "A procedure for the selective enrichment of Halobacteroides halobius and related bacteria from anaerobic hypersaline sediments."FEMS Microbiology Letters 42.2 (1987): 201–204.

External links
J.P. Euzéby: List of Prokaryotic names with Standing in Nomenclature

Type strain of Halobacteroides halobius at BacDive -  the Bacterial Diversity Metadatabase

Halanaerobiales
Bacteria described in 1984